Tony Arzenta (internationally released as Big Guns and No Way Out) is a 1973 Italian noir film directed by Duccio Tessari. The film was commercially successful.

Plot 
When the Milan based mafia hitman Tony Arzenta asks to get out of the business, his bosses decide to kill him as he knows too much but accidentally kill his wife and child instead. He embarks on a campaign of revenge in a journey that takes him both to Hamburg and Copenhagen.

Cast 
 Alain Delon: Tony Arzenta
 Richard Conte: Nick Gusto
 Carla Gravina: Sandra
 Marc Porel: Domenico Maggio
 Roger Hanin: Carré
 Nicoletta Machiavelli: Anna Arzenta
 Lino Troisi: Rocco Cutitta
 Silvano Tranquilli: Montani, the Interpol officer 
 Corrado Gaipa: Arzenta's Father
 Umberto Orsini: Isnello, Gusto's right-hand man
 Giancarlo Sbragia: Luca Dennino
 Erika Blanc: The prostitute
 Ettore Manni: Gesmundo, the sauna owner
 Loredana Nusciak: Gesmundo's Lover
 Rosalba Neri: Cutitta's Wife 
 Maria Pia Conte: Carré's Secretary
 Anton Diffring: Hans Grunwald
 Alberto Farnese: The Man who meets Carré in the nightclub

Release
Tony Arzenta was released in France on August 23, 1973.
The film was released in Italy on September 7, 1973, where it was distributed by Titanus. It grossed a total of 1,945,982,000 Italian lire on its release.

See also
 List of Italian films of 1973
 List of French films of 1973

Footnotes

References

External links

1973 films
Films about contract killing
Italian films about revenge
Films set in Copenhagen
Films set in Hamburg
Films set in Italy
Films directed by Duccio Tessari
Films produced by Alain Delon
Mafia films
Films scored by Gianni Ferrio
1970s Italian films